Euborellia stali is a species of earwig in the family Anisolabididae.

See also
 List of Dermapterans of Sri Lanka

References

Anisolabididae
Insects described in 1864